Brad Dexter (born Boris Michel Soso; April 9, 1917 – December 12, 2002) was an American actor and film producer. He is known for tough-guy and western roles, including the 1960 film The Magnificent Seven (1960), and producing several films for Sidney J. Furie such as Lady Sings the Blues. He is also known for a short marriage to Peggy Lee, a friendship with Marilyn Monroe and for saving Frank Sinatra from drowning. Dexter's tough-guy roles contrasted with his easygoing and friendly real-life personality.

Life and career

Early life
Dexter was born in Goldfield, Nevada, the second of three children (all boys) born to Marko and Ljubica Šošo (later known as Marko and Violet Soso), who were ethnic Serb immigrants from Bosnia-Herzegovina. Serbian was Dexter's first language.

The family soon decamped for Los Angeles, where he attended Belmont High School. Tall, burly and handsome with bright blue eyes, Dexter was usually given supporting roles as a rugged character. After a stint as an amateur boxer, Dexter attended the Pasadena Playhouse, where he studied acting. He had a small role in The Mortal Storm (1940). During World War II, he enlisted for military service with the U.S. Army Air Corps, where he met and befriended Karl Malden, a fellow Serbian-American, and appeared uncredited in the Corps play and film Winged Victory (1944).

As Barry Mitchell
After the war, Dexter had a role in Heldorado (1946), a Roy Rogers western, as "Barry Mitchell". He was also credited under this name in Sinbad the Sailor (1947). He appeared on Broadway in Magnolia Alley (1949).

As Brad Dexter
He eventually changed his name to Brad Dexter and landed roles in The Asphalt Jungle (1950) and Fourteen Hours (1951). Dexter's breakthrough role was as a villain in RKO's The Las Vegas Story (1951), starring Victor Mature and Jane Russell. RKO cast him in a similar part in Macao (1952), also with Russell. RKO signed him to a contract.

From January to November 1953, he was married to singer Peggy Lee. The union ended in divorce. She claimed that during their marriage he hardly worked.

Dexter was villainous to John Payne in 99 River Street (1953). He then signed a contract with 20th Century Fox, for whom he made Untamed (1955), Violent Saturday (1955) for director Richard Fleischer, House of Bamboo (1955) for director Samuel Fuller, The Bottom of the Bottle (1956), and Between Heaven and Hell (1956) again with Fleischer.

Dexter was villainous to Joel McCrea in The Oklahoman (1957), produced by Walter Mirisch, and also appeared in Run Silent Run Deep (1958), again as a villain. He largely focused on television, however, appearing in episodes of Climax!, The Gale Storm Show, How to Marry a Millionaire, Pursuit,  Studio One in Hollywood, Wagon Train, Bat Masterson, Have Gun - Will Travel, Zane Grey Theatre, Behind Closed Doors, Cimarron City, Yancy Derringer, This Man Dawson, 77 Sunset Strip, Colt 45, The Man from Blackhawk, Tightrope, Mr. Lucky, Bat Masterton, and Wanted: Dead or Alive, starring Steve McQueen. He made the occasional feature film, such as Last Train from Gun Hill (1959), directed by John Sturges, and Vice Raid (1959), and was second billed in 13 Fighting Men (1960).

The Magnificent Seven
Dexter was then cast as a gunslinger in The Magnificent Seven (1960), directed by John Sturges for Walter Mirisch's production firm The Mirisch Company. Both Sturges and Mirisch had worked with Dexter before. It became his best-known role and most famous film. Characterizing him as a "tough guy at his best in The Magnificent Seven", Dexter's obituary in The Guardian singled out his portrayal of Harry Luck and claimed he was "overshadowed" by his contemporaries:A question that comes up regularly in film trivia quizzes is to name the Magnificent Seven of the 1960 John Sturges western. Easy to start with: Yul Brynner, Steve McQueen, James Coburn, Charles Bronson, Robert Vaughn, and Horst Buchholz. But if Brad Dexter... is usually the last to be mentioned, it is mainly because of the fame of the others; actually, he was rather good as the most mercenary of the septet. ... the cool and taciturn Harry Luck....

Return to television 
The success of The Magnificent Seven did not immediately benefit Dexter's career: he returned to television, guest starring in The Aquanauts, Hawaiian Eye, General Electric Theatre, Tales of Wells Fargo, Surfside 6, The Investigators, and Alcoa Premiere. He could be seen in It Started in Tokyo (1961), The George Raft Story (1961) (playing Bugsy Siegel), X-15 (1962) with Charles Bronson and Johnny Cool (1963). Dexter supported Yul Brynner again in Taras Bulba (1962), Kings of the Sun (1963) (from the producers of Magnificent Seven), and Invitation to a Gunfighter (1964).

In 1963, Dexter was cast as California Supreme Court Justice David S. Terry in "A Gun Is Not a Gentleman" on the syndicated anthology series, Death Valley Days, hosted by Stanley Andrews. Carroll O'Connor portrayed U.S. Senator David C. Broderick of California, who mortally wounded Justice Terry in an 1859 duel. Though past allies in the Democratic Party, Terry, a slavery advocate, challenged the anti-slavery Broderick.

Frank Sinatra
Dexter's friendship with Frank Sinatra began when Dexter saved Sinatra from drowning on May 10, 1964, during production of the World War II film None but the Brave (1965) on the island of Kauai, Hawaii. Sinatra and Ruth Koch, the wife of producer Howard Koch, were swimming when they were swept out to sea by the outgoing tide and nearly drowned. Sinatra's co-star Dexter and two surfers swam out and rescued them. Dexter was later awarded a Red Cross medal for his bravery. Grateful, Sinatra made him vice president of Sinatra Enterprises.

After Dexter appeared in Bus Riley's Back in Town (1965), he made another film with Sinatra, Von Ryan's Express (1965). That year, Dexter complained that acting made him "frustrated as hell. As an actor you don't have control over the medium you're in... you have no control over your destiny."

Dexter produced The Naked Runner (1967), which starred Sinatra and was filmed in London. Dexter and director Sidney J. Furie clashed with Sinatra over the latter's unwillingness to finish the film, and, after it was completed, Dexter resigned. "I was the only guy who dropped Sinatra ... I couldn't put up with his nonsense", Dexter said at the time. Publicly, Dexter denied any falling out with Sinatra. He claimed to have left Sinatra's company to make a film with Furie based on the Sam Sheppard case.

The project eventually became The Lawyer (1970) starring Barry Newman as Petrocelli. He produced two more films for Furie: Little Fauss and Big Halsy (1970) starring Robert Redford, and Lady Sings the Blues (1972) starring Diana Ross as Billie Holiday.

Later career
Dexter returned to acting with roles in Jory (1973), Shampoo (1975), Vigilante Force (1976), The Private Files of J. Edgar Hoover (1977), House Calls (1978) and Winter Kills (1979), and guest parts on McCloud, Kojak, S.W.A.T., Project U.F.O., and The Incredible Hulk. Dexter produced the TV series Skag (1980) starring Karl Malden. His last role was in Cognac (1988).

Family
He was married to Star-Kist tuna heiress Mary Bogdanovich from January 27, 1971, until her death on June 12, 1994.  Later in 1994, he married June Deyer and remained with her until his death.

Death
Dexter died in Rancho Mirage, California, from emphysema, on December 11, 2002, at age 85, and is interred at Desert Memorial Park.

Filmography

Winged Victory (1944) as Jack Browning (uncredited)
Heldorado (1946) as Alec Baxter
Sinbad the Sailor (1947) as Muallin
The Asphalt Jungle (1950) as Bob Brannom
Fourteen Hours (1951) as Reporter (uncredited)
The Las Vegas Story (1952) as Tom Hubler
Macao (1952) as Vincent Halloran
99 River Street (1953) as Victor Rawlins
Untamed (1955) as Lt. Christian
Violent Saturday (1955) as Gil Clayton
House of Bamboo (1955) as Captain Hanson
The Bottom of the Bottle (1956) as Stanley Miller
Between Heaven and Hell (1956) as Lt. Joe 'Little Joe' Johnson
The Oklahoman (1957) as Cass Dobie
Run Silent, Run Deep (1958) as Ens. Gerald Cartwright
Last Train from Gun Hill (1959) as Beero
Vice Raid (1960) as Vince Malone
13 Fighting Men (1960) as Maj. Simon Boyd
The Magnificent Seven (1960) as Harry Luck
Twenty Plus Two (1961) as Leroy Dane
The George Raft Story (1961) as Benny 'Bugsy' Siegal
X-15 (1961) as Maj. Anthony Rinaldi
Taras Bulba (1962) as Shilo
Johnny Cool (1963) as Lennart Crandall
Kings of the Sun (1963) as Ah Haleb
Invitation to a Gunfighter (1964) as Kenarsie
None but the Brave (1965) as Sgt. Bleeker
Bus Riley's Back in Town (1965) as Slocum
Von Ryan's Express (1965) as Sgt. Bostick
Blindfold (1966) as Detective Harrigan
Jory (1973) as Jack
Shampoo (1975) as Senator East
Vigilante Force (1976) as Mayor Bradford
The Private Files of J. Edgar Hoover (1977) as Alvin Karpis
A Bridge Too Far (1977) (Cameo appearance)
House Calls (1978) as Quinn
Winter Kills (1979) as Captain Heller One
Tajna manastirske rakije (1988) as Veljko Pantovich (final role)

References

External links

1917 births
2002 deaths
Burials at Desert Memorial Park
Male actors from Los Angeles
American male film actors
American male television actors
American people of Serbian descent
American people of Bosnia and Herzegovina descent
Deaths from emphysema
20th-century American male actors
Male Western (genre) film actors
United States Army Air Forces personnel of World War II